Annette Hamm (pronounced Haum) is a Canadian news anchor and reporter. Along with Bob Cowan, she currently co-hosts Morning Live, a three-hour morning show that airs on CHCH-TV in Hamilton, Ontario weekdays from 6am to 9am.

Hamm has been at CHCH since 1986. She graduated from the Mohawk College Broadcast Journalism program in 1987. Before being named Morning Live co-host in 2005, Hamm was the station's crime reporter and a backup news anchor. She has also covered general assignment and the environmental beat for the station. She previously co-anchored the Noon News before it was cancelled.

Hamm was named a 2015 Woman of Distinction (Public Affairs), and is a Paul Harris Fellow. She is involved with Food 4 Kids, gritLIT (Hamilton's Literary Festival), the Junior League of Hamilton-Burlington, and the Hamilton Burlington SPCA. She is also a group fitness instructor, and teaches out of the YWCA Hamilton.

Back when CHCH was known as ONtv, Hamm hosted a morning news and business program called The Morning Market.

Hamm grew up on a tobacco farm outside of Langton, Ontario and now lives on Hamilton Mountain with her husband and their two cats.

External links 
 CHCH Hamilton
 Annette Hamm's bio

References 

Canadian television journalists
Living people
Year of birth missing (living people)
Canadian women television journalists